Jam Underground also known as JAMU, is an American rock band noted for its musical improvisation, extended jams, and merging of discrete music genres.
Their music blends elements of a wide variety of genres, including rock, jazz, funk, hip hop, world, electronic, ambient, and classical. Each of their concerts is original in terms of improvised textures, modes, lyrics and multiple guest artists.

Jam Underground is based around the core band member  Chuck Hammer, guitar; and a wide rotating group of artists and improvisers.

References
 Welch, Chris - David Bowie: We Could Be Heroes (Thunder's Mouth Press) 
 Bockris, Victor - Transformer: The Lou Reed Story (Simon & Schuster) 
 Prown, Pete and Newquest, HP - Legends of Rock Guitar (Hal Leonard) 
 Clapton, Diana - Lou Reed & The Velvet Underground (Bobcat Books) 

Musical groups established in 2008
American rock music groups
Jam bands